FC Hilversum is a football club from Hilversum, Netherlands. The club was founded in 1906 as Voorwaarts and is currently playing in the Topklasse, the highest tier of amateur football in the Netherlands. It will play in the inaugural season of the newly formed Dutch third tier Topklasse in 2010–11.

Current squad

External links
 Official site

 
Football clubs in the Netherlands
Football clubs in Hilversum
Association football clubs established in 1906
1906 establishments in the Netherlands